Black Picture Show is a play written by Bill Gunn in 1975. Clive Barnes of the New York Times described it as having "brilliant writing".

Black Picture Show was originally performed at the Vivian Beaumont Theater. The play deals with the conversations between an ageing black screenwriter, playwright, and poet, and his son, among others. It was also published as a book.

In June 2021, a staged reading of Black Picture Show was performed, directed by Awoye Timpo, in conjunction with a gallery exhibition and program series dedicated to the work of Bill Gunn at the Artists Space gallery. The performance was later edited into a feature film.

References

1975 plays
Plays about writers
African-American plays